Santo Anibal Alcalá (born December 23, 1952) is a former Major League Baseball starting pitcher, born in San Pedro de Macorís, Dominican Republic. He batted and threw right-handed during his baseball career. Alcala was signed by the Cincinnati Reds organization as an amateur free agent and initially assigned to the minor leagues.

Major League Baseball career
Alcala made his major league debut on April 10, 1976, with the Cincinnati Reds. Alcala pitched to four batters, giving up four hits and three earned runs in his debut. In 1976, Alcala pitched one shutout. Despite winning 11 games in 1976, Alcala had an earned run average of 4.70, with a strikeout-to-walk ratio of 67–67. While Alcala's team went on to the World Series, Alcala didn't have any playoff appearances. At age 23, Alcala was the second youngest player on an aging 1976 Reds team. In 1977, Alcala had a 5.74 earned run average before being traded to the Expos, where he recorded a 4.69 earned run average. In his final major league appearance, Alcala pitched a scoreless inning in relief, bringing his 1977 earned run average to 4.83.

On May 21, 1977, the Cincinnati Reds traded Alcala to the Montreal Expos for players to be named later. The Expos later sent Shane Rawley and Angel Torres to the Cincinnati Reds to complete the trade. In 1978, Alcala was selected off waivers by the Seattle Mariners, only to be sent back to the Expos in the same year. He never pitched in the major leagues again.

At the time of his retirement Alcala had a 14–11 record, a 4.76 ERA, 121 walks, and 140 strikeouts. Alcala was 8 for 71 hitting, with a lifetime batting average of .113. His lifetime fielding percentage was .978.

References

External links

 40. Santo Alcalá P. Cincinnati Reds 1976

1952 births
Living people
Buffalo Bisons (minor league) players
Cincinnati Reds players
Dominican Republic expatriate baseball players in Canada
Dominican Republic expatriate baseball players in the United States
Indianapolis Indians players
Key West Conchs players

Major League Baseball pitchers
Major League Baseball players from the Dominican Republic
Montreal Expos players
Sportspeople from San Pedro de Macorís
Portland Beavers players
San Jose Missions players
Sioux Falls Packers players
Truchas de Toluca players
Dominican Republic expatriate baseball players in Mexico